Chub Bast (also Romanized as Chūb Bast; also known as Chūbast) is a village in Gatab-e Jonubi Rural District, Gatab District, Babol County, Mazandaran Province, Iran. At the 2006 census, its population was 347, in 78 families.

References 

Populated places in Babol County